Joseph Thomas Willoughby (7 November 1874 – 11 March 1952) was a South African cricketer who played in two Test matches in 1896.

In the first match of the English tour of South Africa in 1895–96, Willoughby took 6 for 15 in the second innings to dismiss Lord Hawke's XI for 92 and give the Western Province XV victory by 74 runs. He later played in the first and third of the three Tests in the series, taking six wickets. In the first Test he dismissed George Lohmann for a pair, and Lohmann did the same to him.

References

External links
 

1874 births
1952 deaths
Cricketers from Aldershot
South Africa Test cricketers
South African cricketers
Western Province cricketers